Swami Ghanananda (died 1969) was a monk of Ramakrishna Mission, who went to Europe to spread the message of Vedanta. He started the Vedanta Centre in London in November 1948. Until 1969 he guided its affairs, established its monastery; edited the publications and also spoke in many parts of the country.

Related links
 Vedanta Centre of UK
 Sri Ramakrishna and His Unique Message - Swami Ghanananda 
 Women Saints of East and West - Swami Ghanananda & John Steward-Wallace 

Monks of the Ramakrishna Mission
1969 deaths
Year of birth missing